Stull is a census-designated place located in Noxen Township, in Wyoming County, Pennsylvania. It appears on the Noxen U.S. Geological Survey Map. It was originally built to house workers for the sawmill located there. Stull once had a post office, school, store and church and once had as many as 500 residents. The mill burned down in 1902, was rebuilt, but then was again closed for a last time in 1906. The local school closed in 1912. After the closing of the sawmill, Stull shifted from lumber to agricultural production and during World War I the remains of the sawmill were scrapped for the war effort. Today, there are a few houses and residents remaining.

References

External links
Stull on Google Maps

Census-designated places in Wyoming County, Pennsylvania
Census-designated places in Pennsylvania